Office Baroque is a Belgian contemporary art gallery situated in Antwerp. The gallery was originally incorporated in 2007 in an apartment on Harmoniestraat in Antwerp by Marie Denkens and Wim Peeters. The gallery occupied a location on Lange Kievitstraat in Antwerp from 2008 till 2013. It opened its first gallery in Brussels on 7 November 2013 with an exhibition by French/American artist Michel Auder in a 1909 cast-iron building by the Brussels architect Paul Hamesse who was part of the Art Nouveau generation. In September 2015, Office Baroque opened a second gallery space in the vicinity of the Centre for Fine Arts, Brussels. In September 2020 the gallery relocated to its original space on Harmoniestraat in Antwerp. The gallery is named after one of Gordon Matta-Clark’s public interventions, untimely demolished after extensive protests in Antwerp in 1980.

The gallery has represented American, Asian and European artists and has produced both exhibitions and publications. Office Baroque presents exhibitions at international art fairs such as Frieze Art Fair, London; FIAC, Paris; Art Basel, Miami Beach; Independent, New York.

Gallery artists

Michel Auder
Matthew Brannon
Sascha Braunig
Neil Campbell
Mathew Cerletty
Catharine Czudej
Alexandre da Cunha
David Diao
Keith Farquhar
Robin Graubard
Christopher Knowles
Owen Land
Leigh Ledare
Junko Oki
Tyson Reeder
Michael Rey
Davis Rhodes
Margaret Salmon
Ataru Sato
Daniel Sinsel
Rezi van Lankveld
B. Wurtz

External links
 Official site

References

Contemporary art galleries in Belgium
Art Nouveau architecture in Brussels
Buildings and structures completed in 1909